Vince Tyra is an American athletic administrator, who is best known for his tenure as the athletic director at the University of Louisville. He served in this role from 2018 until his resignation in December 2021. Tyra replaced embattled Tom Jurich, who faced allegations of misconduct regarding the 2017–18 NCAA Division I men's basketball corruption scandal. Prior to his appointment, Tyra worked in private equity investing with the firm of Southfield Capital.

Tyra's father, Charlie Tyra, played basketball for the Louisville Cardinals men's basketball program from 1954-57 and is regarded as one of the greatest players in program history. 

On March 27, 2018, Tyra hired Chris Mack to be the next head coach of the University's Men's basketball team. The hire was widely praised and has led to early success in recruiting. Tyra has said that the hire has sparked "morale [to be] up" within a program and fanbase marred by scandals in recent years.

On August 22, 2018, Tyra received an email from his predecessor's son, Mark Jurich. The email received publicity because of its scathing nature, but both sides have downplayed its importance.

On December 3, 2018, it was reported by The Courier-Journal that Tyra had hired Scott Satterfield as the new head coach of the Louisville Cardinals football team, replacing the fired Bobby Petrino.

On December 8, 2021, Tyra resigned as the athletic director at the University of Louisville.

References

External links
 

1965 births
Living people
People from Louisville, Kentucky
Kentucky Wildcats baseball players